George Gartshone Stewart (born 18 October 1920) was a Scottish professional footballer who played as an inside forward in the Football League for Queens Park Rangers, Brentford and Shrewsbury Town.

Personal life 
Stewart served in the Royal Air Force during the Second World War.

Career statistics

References

1920 births
Possibly living people
Scottish footballers
Hamilton Academical F.C. wartime guest players
Brentford F.C. players
Queens Park Rangers F.C. players
Shrewsbury Town F.C. players
Dartford F.C. players
English Football League players
Sportspeople from the Scottish Borders
Association football inside forwards
Brentford F.C. wartime guest players
Royal Air Force personnel of World War II